Madhuvidhu Theerum Mumbe is a 1985 Indian Malayalam film, directed by K. Ramachandran and produced by Pushparajan. The film stars Prem Nazir, Devan, Jalaja and Hari in the lead roles. The film featured a musical score composed by K. J. Joy.

Cast

Prem Nazir as Father Kizhakkethil
Devan as Sunny
Jalaja as Shobha
Hari as Swami/Jose
Prathapachandran as Priest
Aroor Sathyan as Kuppuswami
C. I. Paul as Advocate
Kuthiravattam Pappu as Thoma
Manorama as Palakkattu Maami
Meena as Shoshamma
P. K. Abraham as Mathew Varghese
Santhakumari as Mariya
T. G. Ravi as Chackochan

Soundtrack
The music was composed by K. J. Joy and the lyrics were written by Poovachal Khader.

References

External links
 

1985 films
1980s Malayalam-language films